Mayra González Borroto (born 11 July 1968 in Sancti Spíritus)  is a female rower from Cuba. She is a two-time Olympian (2000 and 2008) for her native country, and twice won a gold medal at the Pan American Games (2003 and 2007).

References
 sports-reference

1968 births
Living people
Cuban female rowers
Olympic rowers of Cuba
Rowers at the 2000 Summer Olympics
Rowers at the 2007 Pan American Games
Rowers at the 2008 Summer Olympics
People from Sancti Spíritus
Pan American Games gold medalists for Cuba
Pan American Games medalists in rowing
Rowers at the 2003 Pan American Games
Medalists at the 2003 Pan American Games
Medalists at the 2007 Pan American Games
21st-century Cuban women